Tai Thanh, or Tai Then, is a Southwestern Tai language of Nghe An Province and Thanh Hoa Province, north-central Vietnam.

Tayten (300 speakers as of 1995) is spoken in the 2 villages of Ban Phia and Ban Tenngiou in Pakxeng District, Luang Prabang Province, Laos. It is either Tai Then or Thin.

References

Southwestern Tai languages
Languages of Vietnam